Megachile antisanellae is a species of bee in the family Megachilidae. It was described by Cameron in 1903.

References

Antisanellae
Insects described in 1903